Allianz-Mission is a Christian non-governmental organization based in Dietzhölztal. It is active in evangelization and humanitarian help throughout the world. Founded in 1889 by Fredrik Franson. The institution is sponsored by churches, organizations and private persons.

Allianz-Mission declares its intention to support needy people regardless of race, religion, origin and provide cross cultural relationship with long-term perspective.

The organization has affiliates in Europe (Belgium, Austria, Italy, Spain) and works in developing countries, including Vietnam, Mali, Russia, Tajikistan, Brazil, Tanzania, Philippines, India, and Sri Lanka, as well as in Japan.

The organization spent about US$130,000 for community development in Vietnam.

See also
The Evangelical Alliance Mission

References

External links
Allianz-Mission Website, German

Christian charities
Evangelical parachurch organizations
Charities based in Germany
Christian organisations based in Germany
Middle Hesse
Non-profit organisations based in Hesse